Shri Shivaji Preparatory Military School, Pune is a military boarding school in the heart of Pune city in India. In 1932, Rajaram III, the Maharaja of Kolhapur decided to use The Chhatrapati Shivaji Memorial Hall in Pune for the military school. The land of Shri Shivaji Preparatory Military School was donated by Shiledar Shirole (Patil) family who was one of the founding members of this school. The classes were started on 20 June 1932.

Boys of age 4–5 and 9–10 are admitted to the school. The school also allocates students of classes  1st to 4th and 5th to 10th in different buildings on the premises. An entrance test is held annually in April/ May for the academic session starting in June. The school shares its campus with The AISSMS College of Hotel Management and Catering Technology (HMCT). A girl's hostel for college-going girls aptly named The Jijamata Girl's Hostel and mess is placed near the college.

It is a preparatory school for those desiring to join the National Defence Academy (India) due to it being one of the oldest military boarding schools in India.

Notable alumni
 Pratapsingh Raoji Rane – Chief Minister of Goa
 Harshavardhan Patil – Cabinet Minister, Maharshtra
 Chandu Borde – Ex- Chairman, Selection Committee, BCCI
 Parikshit Sahni – Film & TV Actor
 Ritesh Deshmukh – Film Actor
 Sunil Manchanda – Advertisement Producer
 Meghrajji III – the Maharaja of Dhangandhra-Halvad
 Farokh Engineer – Former Indian Test Cricketer
 Madhusudan Rege – Former Indian Test Cricketer

See also 
List of schools in Pune

References

External links
 

Military schools in India
Boys' schools in India
High schools and secondary schools in Maharashtra
Boarding schools in Maharashtra
Monuments and memorials to Shivaji
Schools in Pune
1932 establishments in India
Educational institutions established in 1932